Jamelle Holieway (born June 25, 1967) is an American former college and professional football player who was a quarterback for the University of Oklahoma.  He led the Oklahoma Sooners to a national championship in 1985.

Jamelle Holieway is considered one of the greatest option quarterbacks in NCAA Division I-A history. Highly recruited from Banning High School in Wilmington, Los Angeles, California, under longtime head coach Chris Ferragamo, Holieway attracted interest from a swarm of schools. Oklahoma, Nebraska, Notre Dame, Colorado, Oregon and USC came after Holieway. His decision to play for the Sooners came at the last minute, as he had a three-year-old sister that he didn't want to leave behind.

College career
At Oklahoma, he took over for an injured Troy Aikman in his freshman year in the Miami game when Jerome Brown and Dan Sileo broke Aikman's leg. Holieway led the Sooners to an 11–1–0 record under Coach Barry Switzer and won the 1986 Orange Bowl against the Penn State Nittany Lions for the national championship.  Holieway threw a 71-yard touchdown pass in that game to All-American tight end Keith Jackson. Holieway was the first true freshman quarterback to lead his team to the national title.

Holieway tore the anterior cruciate ligament (ACL) in his left knee in a game versus the Oklahoma State Cowboys on November 7, 1987.  Holieway was running an option-play to the left and turned to cut upfield.  His left knee got caught on the Superturf on Owen Field. He underwent reconstructive knee surgery shortly after the injury, and rehabilitated in the offseason.  Though he came back to play the following season, he saw limited action and reinjured the leg on October 8, 1988 versus the Texas Longhorns.

The injury plagued Holieway for the remainder of the 1988 season, and he eventually lost his starting job to Charles Thompson.  Thompson, however, broke his leg on the final play of the Nebraska game on November 19, 1988, so Holieway became the starter again for the Citrus Bowl vs. Clemson, in a 13–6 loss on January 2, 1989.

Holieway finished his Sooner career with 2,713 yards rushing on 539 attempts (an average of 5.0 yards per carry) and 32 touchdowns.  Through the air, he threw 257 times, completing 117 passes for 2,430 yards with 22 touchdowns and 15 interceptions. His passing efficiency rating was 84.9 over 39 collegiate games.  

Later on, Holieway acknowledged that he received favors from school boosters and Coach Switzer, but denied ever receiving any cash payments.

College statistics

Professional career
Holieway played professionally for the National Football League's Los Angeles Raiders (1989–1990) and the Canadian Football League's BC Lions (1991–1992).

Personal life
Holieway still lives in Oklahoma and spends much of his summers coaching football camps.

References

External links
 Jamelle Holieway Career Stats, Oklahoma Sooners
 Holieway's 71 yard touchdown pass to Keith Jackson in the 1986 Orange Bowl National Championship Game

1967 births
Living people
American football quarterbacks
Oklahoma Sooners football players
Players of American football from California
Sportspeople from Los Angeles County, California
People from Carson, California